Yvonne Yung (born 17 September 1968) is a Hong Kong actress and former beauty pageant winner.

Early life 
Yung was born on 17 September 1968 in Beijing. At age 12, Yung immigrated to Hong Kong.

Career 
Yung started her entertainment career as a model and dancer. 

In 1989, Yung became the winner for Miss Asia Pageant (local pageant in Hong Kong). Yung was Hong Kong delegate for Miss World 1989 held in her country, but did not enter the top 10.

Yung was known for her acting performances in Category III films. Yung has appeared in A Chinese Torture Chamber Story, Ancient Chinese Whorehouse, Romance of the Vampires, Fake Pretty Woman, and many others. 

In 2001, Yung retired from the film industry but still made appearances in television series.

Personal life 
In 2003, Yung married Ng Wai-kit (伍偉傑), the vice CEO of an American casino. Ying's marriage ended in divorce in 2005.

In January 2007, Yung married Will Liu Lunhao (劉倫浩), a professional gym operator, and gave birth to their daughter Crystal in October that year. In 2009, she and Liu were named spokespeople for the Chinese government's campaign to convince people to seek help for sexually transmitted diseases.

Filmography
 1989 The Iron Butterfly
 1991 Dances with the Dragon - Diana Kung
 1992 Freedom Run Q 
 1992 Temptation of the Spiritual World 
 1993 Don't Stop My Crazy Love For You 
 1993 Guns Of Dragon 
 1993 My Pale Lover
 1983 My Virgin 
 1993 Sexy Story 
 1994 Drunken Master II 
 1994 A Chinese Torture Chamber Story - Siu-bak-choi (Little Cabbage)
 1994 Ancient Chinese Whorehouse 
 1984 The Power of Money 
 1984 Romance of the Vampires 
 1994 Sex and the Emperor 
 1994 Bloody Brothers 
 1994 Fatal Obsession 
 1994 The Tragic Fantasy - Tiger of Wanchai 
 1994 The Wild Lover
 1995 Black Dream 
 1995 A Fake Pretty Woman
 1985 Spike Drink Gang
 1995 Lover of the Last Empress
 1996 Hero of Swallow
 1997 The Jail in Burning Island
 1997 Walk In
 1998 Exodus from Afar
 1998 Nightmare Zone
 1999 Undercover Girls 
 2001 Yvonne Yung: Fantastic Dream Japanese Vacation (Pictorial Videos)
 2002 Freaky Story 
 2003 The Murderer Is My Wife 
 2003 Return of Devil
 2004 Twin of Brothers 
 2006 The Great Dunhuang 
 2012 Tales of Two Cities 
 2012 All for Love 
 2013 Born to Love You
 2014 Fighting 
 2014 Town of the Dragon 
 2014 Give Seven Days 
 2016 Like Life
 2017 I Love My President Though He's a Psycho
 2019 Hello Love 
 2022 Side Story of Volant Fox

References

External links

Love HK Film Entry
Yvonne Yung at hkmdb.com
Yvonne Yung at chinesemov.com

1968 births
Living people
20th-century Hong Kong actresses
21st-century Hong Kong actresses
Miss World 1989 delegates
Alumni of The Hong Kong Academy for Performing Arts
Hong Kong beauty pageant winners
Hong Kong film actresses
Hong Kong television actresses